Tom Dolan (born 1975) is an American Olympic swimmer.

Tom Dolan may also refer to:

 Tom Dolan (engineer), engineer who worked on the Apollo space program
 Tom Dolan (baseball) (1855–1913), catcher in Major League baseball
 Thomas J. Dolan, American engineer and educator